Deku may refer to: 
 Deku (The Legend of Zelda), a fictional race of wooden plant-like creatures
 Izuku Midoriya (nicknamed "Deku"), main character of the anime and manga series My Hero Academia
 Deku, a character from the manga Blood Lad
 Deku, a character from the video game Fighters Megamix
 Deku, a mecha from the anime Dai-Shogun - Great Revolution
 Deku, a character from the Telugu film Mama Alludu

People with the surname
 Anthony Deku (1923–2015), Ghanaian politician
 Erich Deku, former owner of Bischofstein Castle
 Maria Deku (1901–1983), German politician

See also
 Decoud, surname
 Decus (disambiguation)